The Matrons' Council for Great Britain and Ireland was established in 1894 during the campaign for the registration of nurses.

Margaret Huxley (1854–1940) was a founder member. Agnes Karll (1868–1927) of Germany was named an honorary member for her role in nursing reform and advancing the nursing profession.

The Council was represented on the Central Committee for the State Registration of Nurses in 1908.

References

Nursing organisations in the United Kingdom